Mohd Syafiq bin Mohd Yusof (born 7 December 1992) is a Malaysian filmmaker. He is a younger brother of actor Syamsul Yusof and son of veteran actor Yusof Haslam. Initially began his career by making short films, his directorial debut, SAM: Saya Amat Mencintaimu was released in 2012. Since then, he directed seven notable films which all of them became commercial success.

Early life
Syafiq Yusof was born on 7 December 1992 in Kuala Lumpur. He hails from a family of filmmakers and actors. His older brother, Syamsul is an actor and film director who is well-known for directing horror film series Munafik and Munafik 2, the latter of which currently ranks as the highest-grossing Malaysian made film. His cousins Rizal Ashreff, Sabrina Ali, Aliff Ali and Miller Khan are also actors. His father is a veteran actor turned film director cum producer, Yusof Haslam.

Career
Hailing from the well-known Yusof family, Syafiq began his filmmaking career by making short films. SAM: Saya Amat Mencintaimu, his feature film directorial debut, starring Shaheizy Sam and Lisa Surihani, was released on 19 August 2012 during the Hari Raya Aidilfitri celebration. Also in the same year, he and his cousin, Rizal Ashreff co-directed Evolusi KL Drift: The Series, a TV series adaptation from 2008 film, Evolusi KL Drift directed by his brother, Syamsul Yusof reprised his role in the TV series.

On 11 January 2013, Syafiq and his two business partners set-up Viper Studios which specializes in film production, visual effects, post-production, and animation, where he served as the Chief Executive Officer.

A year later, he directed Abang Long Fadil, a spin-off from 2011 film, KL Gangster, one of its main star, Zizan Razak reprising his role as Fadil. The film was released in May 2014 to popular success. His third movie, a horror documentary film entitled Villa Nabila was released in January 2015, starring Pekin Ibrahim and Tisha Shamsir, which is based on the 2013 eponymous bungalow incident.

Syafiq subsequently directed his fifth film which began principal photography on 13 November 2014 in Kuala Lumpur and Putrajaya. Released on 8 December 2016, a mystery science fiction Desolasi starring his brother Syamsul as Aiman, a visual artist who deals with never-ending problems starts to wonder the judgment given by God which brings him to stuck in another dimension leading him being fully alone until he starts meeting a mysterious woman named Maya. For this film, he utilized the Anton-Babinski syndrome metaphor as a subject into the storyline and using special effects to blanking the city of Kuala Lumpur. It also stars Jalaluddin Hassan, Pekin Ibrahim, and Bella Dally.

His seventh film, Abang Long Fadil 2 was released on 24 August 2017. With a budget estimated RM 3.2 million, the film earns highest grossed more than RM 18.15 million, behind Munafik directed by his brother, which grossed RM 17.04 million.

On 8 March 2018, his action film KL Special Force was released, starring Rosyam Nor, Fattah Amin and his brother, who played Asyraf, a leader of the Anarkis Gang. The film sets up new record in Malaysian film industry by garnering highest box office grossing more than RM12.1 million and received mixed positive reviews from film critics.

His latest effort, a psychological horror Misteri Dilaila was released on February 21, 2019. Principal photography took place in Fraser's Hill, Pahang; the film was starring Zul Ariffin, Elizabeth Tan, Rosyam Nor, Nam Ron, Sasqia Dahuri and others.

It was announced in September 2019 that he would be directing the third sequel of Polis Evo with Shaheizy Sam and Zizan Razak reprising their respective roles.

Personal life
Syafiq married with his long-time girlfriend, Aisyeah Zainal on 5 April 2014. The couple have three children, namely two daughters – Nuur Jannah (born 2016), Nuur Nusaybah (born 2018) and a son - Muhamad Nu'Aiman (born 2023).

Filmography

Film

Television series

Music video

Awards and nominations

References

External links

1992 births
Living people
People from Kuala Lumpur
Malaysian people of Malay descent
Malaysian Muslims
Malaysian male actors
Malaysian film directors
Malaysian screenwriters
Malay-language film directors
21st-century Malaysian male actors